The following is a list of Christmas television specials partly or completely originating in the U.S.

Christmas-related films and specials
Dates and networks shown correspond to the special's first telecast.
 12 Tiny Christmas Tales (December 7, 2001, Cartoon Network)
 Aliens First Christmas (1991, Disney Channel)
 Amahl and the Night Visitors (1951, NBC) (most of the 1951 cast members stayed with this production until 1963)
 Amahl and the Night Visitors (1963, NBC) (all-new production)
 Amahl and the Night Visitors (1978, NBC) (all-new production)
 Babes in Toyland (1950)
 Babes in Toyland (1954)
 Babes in Toyland (1960)
 Babes in Toyland (1986, NBC)
 The Balloonatiks: Christmas Without a Claus (December 14, 1996, FOX)
 B.C.: A Special Christmas (1981, HBO)
 The Bear Who Slept Through Christmas (1973, NBC)
 The Bears Who Saved Christmas (1994, syndication)
 Beebo Saves Christmas (December 1, 2021, UPN)
 The Bell Telephone Hour Christmas specials (1959–1968, NBC)
 Benji's Very Own Christmas Story (1978, ABC)
 The Berenstain Bears' Christmas Tree (1979, NBC)
 The Best Christmas Pageant Ever (December 5, 1983, HBO)
 Bluetoes The Christmas Elf (1988)
 The Cabbage Patch Kids' First Christmas (1984, ABC)
 Charlie's Christmas Secret (December 20, 1984, syndication)
 A Chipmunk Christmas (December 14, 1981, NBC)
 Christopher the Christmas Tree (December 24, 1993, FOX)
 A Christmas Adventure (1991, syndication)
 A Christmas Calendar (1987, PBS)
 A Christmas Carol (1954, CBS)
 A Christmas Carol (1971, ABC)
 A Christmas Carol (1984, CBS)
 A Christmas Carol (1999, TNT)
 Christmas Every Day (1996, The Family Channel)
 Christmas In Rockefeller Center (1998, NBC)
 Christmas in Tattertown (1988, Nickelodeon)
 Christmas Is (1970, syndication)
 The Christmas Tree (1991, USA Network)
 The City That Forgot About Christmas (1974, syndication)
 A Claymation Christmas Celebration (1987, CBS)
 CMA Country Christmas (2009–present, ABC)
 A Cool Like That Christmas (December 23, 1993, FOX)
 Deck the Halls (1994, syndication)
 Deck the Halls with Wacky Walls (1983, NBC)
 Donner (2001, ABC Family)
 Edith Ann's Christmas (Just Say Noël)  (December 14, 1996, ABC)
 Elf: Buddy's Musical Christmas (December 16, 2014, NBC)
 The Enchanted Nutcracker (1961, ABC)
 A Family Circus Christmas (1979, NBC)
 Father Christmas and the Missing Reindeer (1998)
 A Garfield Christmas (1987, CBS)
 The Ghosts of Christmas Eve (1999, Fox Family)
 The Glo-Friends Save Christmas (1985, syndication)
 Grandma Got Run Over by a Reindeer (2000, The WB)
 The Great Christmas Light Fight (a recurring reality series) (2013–present, ABC)
 The Guardians of the Galaxy Holiday Special (2022, Disney+)
 Gwen Stefani's You Make It Feel Like Christmas (2017, NBC)
 The Happy Elf (2005, NBC)
 A Hollywood Hounds Christmas (1994, syndication)
 The House Without a Christmas Tree (1972, CBS)
 How the Grinch Stole Christmas! (1966, CBS)
 How Murray Saved Christmas (December 5, 2014, NBC)
 Ice Age: A Mammoth Christmas (November 24, 2011, FOX)
 In the Nick of Time (1991, NBC)
 It's Christmas, Dr. Joe! (2004, syndication)
 It's a SpongeBob Christmas! (2012, CBS)
 Jingle Bell Rap (1991, syndication)
 Jingle Bell Rock (1995)
 John Grin's Christmas (1986, ABC)
 Jolly Old St. Nicholas (1994, syndication)
 The Little Rascals Christmas Special (1979, NBC)
 Little Spirit: Christmas in New York (December 10, 2008, NBC)
 The Littlest Angel (1969)
 Lollipop Dragon: The Great Christmas Race (1985)
 A Merry Mirthworm Christmas (1987, Showtime)
 Milroy: Santa's Misfit Mutt (1987)
 Mister Magoo's Christmas Carol (1962, NBC)
 The Moo Family Holiday Hoe-Down (1992)
 A Mouse, a Mystery and Me (1987, NBC)
 My Christmas Special (2009, PBS)
 The Nativity (1952, CBS)
 Nick & Noel (1993)
 The Night B4 Christmas (2003)
 The Night Before Christmas (1968, syndicated)
 The Night the Animals Talked (1970, ABC)
 Noël (1992, NBC)
 The Nutcracker (1958, CBS) (presented on Playhouse 90)
 The Nutcracker (1965, CBS) (German-American co-production, with changed plotline)
 The Nutcracker (Baryshnikov version) (1977, CBS)
 The Nutcracker (2011, PBS) (presented on Live from Lincoln Center)
 Nutcracker on Ice (several versions)
 The Nuttiest Nutcracker (1999, CBS)
 O Christmas Tree (1994)
 Olive, the Other Reindeer (1999, FOX)
 Online Adventures of Ozzie the Elf (1997)
 Phineas and Ferb Christmas Vacation! (2009, Disney Channel)
 The Pink Panther in: A Pink Christmas (1978, ABC)
 P.J.'s Unfunnybunny Christmas (1993, ABC)
 The Poky Little Puppy's First Christmas (1992)
 The Promise (1963)
 Raggedy Ann and Andy in The Great Santa Claus Caper (1978/CBS)
 Reindeer In Here (2022, CBS)
 Roxanne's Best Christmas Ever (1998)
 Santa and the Three Bears (1970, syndication)
 Santa Claus and the Magic Drum (1996)
 The Santa Claus Brothers (December 14, 2001, Disney Channel)
 Santa Mouse and the Ratdeer (2000, Fox Family)
 Santa's Christmas Crash (1995)
 Santa's Last Christmas (1999)
 Santa's Pocket Watch (1980)
 Santa's Magic Toy Bag (1983, Showtime)
 Santabear's First Christmas (1986, ABC)
 Santabear's High Flying Adventure (1987, CBS)
  Santa vs. the Snowman (1997, ABC)
 Simple Gifts: Six Episodes for Christmas (1977)
 Snowden's Christmas (1999)
 A Snow White Christmas (1980, CBS)
 A Solid Gold Christmas (1982, syndication)
 The Spirit of Christmas (1953)
 The Stableboy's Christmas (1979, syndication)
 A Star for Jeremy (1982)
 The Stingiest Man in Town (1956, NBC)
 The Story of Santa Claus (1998, CBS)
 The Soulmates in the Gift of Light (1991) 
 Timothy Tweedle: The First Christmas Elf (December 25, 2000, Toon Disney)
 The Tiny Tree (December 14, 1975, NBC)
 Tom and Jerry in A Cat and Mouse Christmas (1977, ABC)
 The Trolls and the Christmas Express (1981, HBO)
 Twas the Night Before Christmas (1977, ABC)
 The Twelve Days of Christmas (1993, NBC)
 A Very Boy Band Holiday (2021, ABC)
 A Very Merry Cricket (December 14, 1973, ABC)
 A Very Retail Christmas (December 24, 1990, NBC)
 The Ugly Duckling's Christmas Wish (1996, syndication)
 Up on the Housetop (1992, syndication)
 We Wish You a Merry Christmas (1994, syndication)
 A Wish for Wings That Work (1991, CBS)
 The Wish That Changed Christmas (1991, CBS)
 Where's Waldo? The Merry X-mas Mix Up! (1992)
 Why the Bears Dance on Christmas Eve (December 12, 1977, ABC)
  The Wonderful World of Disney: Magical Holiday Celebration (2016, ABC)
 Yes, Virginia, There is a Santa Claus (1974, ABC)
 Ziggy's Gift (1982, ABC)
 The Zoomer Crew's First Christmas (2000)

Franchises and groupings

Rankin/Bass
 Rudolph the Red-Nosed Reindeer (1964/NBC; has aired on CBS since 1972)
 Cricket on the Hearth (1967/NBC)
 The Little Drummer Boy (1968/NBC)
 Frosty the Snowman (1969/CBS)
 Santa Claus Is Comin' to Town (1970/ABC)
 Festival of Family Classics: "A Christmas Tree" (1972/syndication)
 Twas the Night Before Christmas (1974/CBS)
 The Year Without a Santa Claus (1974/ABC)
 The First Christmas: The Story of the First Christmas Snow (1975/NBC)
 Frosty's Winter Wonderland (1976/ABC)
 Rudolph's Shiny New Year (1976/ABC)
 The Little Drummer Boy, Book II (1976/NBC)
 Nestor, the Long-Eared Christmas Donkey (1977/ABC)
 The Stingiest Man in Town (1978/ABC)
 Jack Frost (1979/NBC)
 Rudolph and Frosty's Christmas in July (1979/ABC)
 Pinocchio's Christmas (1980/ABC)
 The Leprechauns' Christmas Gold (1981/ABC)
 The Life and Adventures of Santa Claus (1985/CBS)
 Santa, Baby! (2001)
 Frosty Returns (1992/CBS)
 The Legend of Frosty the Snowman (2004)
 A Miser Brothers' Christmas (2008/ABC Family)

Charlie Brown / Peanuts
 A Charlie Brown Christmas (1965/CBS)
 It's Christmastime Again, Charlie Brown (1992/CBS)
 Charlie Brown's Christmas Tales (2002/ABC)
 I Want a Dog for Christmas, Charlie Brown (2003/ABC)

Walt Disney
 From All of Us to All of You (1958/ABC)
 A Magical Disney Christmas (1981/CBS)
 A Disney Christmas Gift (1982/CBS)
 A Goof Troop Christmas (1992 & 1993/ABC)
 Prep & Landing (2009/ABC)
 Prep & Landing: Operation: Secret Santa (2010/ABC)
 Prep & Landing: Naughty vs. Nice (2011/ABC)

Mickey Mouse
 Mickey Mouse Works: "The Nutcracker" (1999/ABC)
 Mickey Mouse Works: "Mickey's Christmas Chaos" (2000/ABC) 
 House of Mouse: "Clarabelle's Christmas List" (2002/Toon Disney)
 House of Mouse: "Pete's Christmas Caper" (2002/Toon Disney)
 Duck the Halls: A Mickey Mouse Christmas Special (2016/Disney Channel)
 Mickey and Minnie Wish Upon a Christmas (2021/Disney Junior)
 Mickey Saves Christmas (2022/Disney Junior)

Winnie the Pooh
 Welcome to Pooh Corner: "Christmas at Pooh Corner" (1983/Disney Channel)
 Welcome to Pooh Corner: "Christmas is for Sharing" (1984/Disney Channel)
 Winnie the Pooh and Christmas Too (1991/ABC)

Pixar
 Toy Story That Time Forgot (2014/ABC)

Hanna-Barbera
 A Christmas Story (1972/syndication)
 Casper's First Christmas (1979/NBC)
 Christmas Comes to Pac-Land (1982/ABC)
 The Little Troll Prince (1987/syndication)
 Silent Night, Holy Night (1976/syndication)
 The Town Santa Forgot (1993/NBC)

The Flintstones
 The Flintstones: "Christmas Flintstone" (1964/ABC)
 A Flintstone Christmas (1977/NBC)
 A Flintstone Family Christmas (1993/ABC)
 A Flintstones Christmas Carol (1994/ABC)

The SmurfsThe Smurfs' Christmas Special (1982/NBC)
 'Tis the Season to Be Smurfy (1987/NBC)

Yogi Bear
 Yogi's First Christmas (1980/syndication)
 Yogi Bear's All Star Comedy Christmas Caper (1982/CBS)

Jim Henson / The Muppets / Sesame Street
 The Great Santa Claus Switch (1970/CBS)
 Emmet Otter's Jug-Band Christmas (1977/HBO)
 Christmas Eve on Sesame Street (1978/PBS)
 A Special Sesame Street Christmas (1978/CBS)
 John Denver and the Muppets: A Christmas Together (1979/ABC)
 The Christmas Toy (1986/ABC)
 A Muppet Family Christmas (1987/ABC)
 Mr. Willowby's Christmas Tree (1995/CBS)
 Elmo Saves Christmas (1996/PBS)
 It's a Very Merry Muppet Christmas Movie (2002/NBC)
 A Sesame Street Christmas Carol (2006/PBS)
 Elmo's Christmas Countdown (2007/ABC)
 A Muppet Christmas: Letters to Santa (2008/NBC)
 Lady Gaga and the Muppets Holiday Spectacular (2013/ABC)
 Once Upon a Sesame Street Christmas (2016/HBO)

DreamWorks Animation
 Joseph King of Dreams (2000)
 Shrek the Halls (2007/ABC)
 Merry Madagascar (2009/NBC)
 Kung Fu Panda Holiday (2010/NBC)
 Trolls Holiday (2017/NBC)
 How to Train Your Dragon: Homecoming (2019/NBC)

Looney Tunes
 Bugs Bunny's Looney Christmas Tales (1979/CBS)
 Bah, Humduck! A Looney Tunes Christmas (2006)

Chucklewood Critters
 The Christmas Tree Train (1983, syndication)
 T'was the Day Before Christmas (1993, syndication)

Davey and Goliath
 Davey and Goliath: Christmas Lost and Found (1965/Syndication)
 Davey and Goliath's Snowboard Christmas (2004/Hallmark Channel)

Precious Moments, Inc.
 Timmy's Gift: A Precious Moments Christmas (1991, NBC)
 Timmy's Special Delivery: A Precious Moments Christmas (1993)

Celebrity-hosted and variety shows

This list includes U.K. productions shown in the U.S.

 The George Burns Early, Early, Early Christmas Special (1981)
 The Captain and Tennille Christmas Show (1976)
 Jackie DeShannon: What the World Needs Now (1978)
 Michael Jackson: Beat It (1982)
 Taylor Swift: Shake It Off (2014)
 Elton John: Crocodile Rock (1973)
 Elton John: I'm Still Standing (1983)
 Tom Jones: What's New Pussycat (1963)
 Carly Rae Jepsen: Call Me Maybe (2012)
 Selena Gomez: Come & Get It (2013)
 Journey: Don't Stop Believing (1981)
 Lady Gaga: Applause (2013)
 The Johnny Cash Christmas Special (1976–1979)
 Kelly Clarkson: Kelly Clarkson Presents: When Christmas Comes Around (2021, NBC)
 Kelly Clarkson: Kelly Clarkson's Cautionary Christmas Music Tale (2013/NBC)
 A Colbert Christmas: The Greatest Gift of All (2008/Comedy Central)
 CMA Country Christmas (2010–present)
 Mac Davis: I Believe in Christmas (1977)
 John Denver's Rocky Mountain Christmas (with The Muppets) (1975)
 John Denver: Montana Christmas Skies (1991)
 Jeff Dunham's Very Special Christmas Special (2008/Comedy Central)
 Dave Foley's The True Meaning of Christmas Specials Freddie the Freeloader's Christmas Dinner (1981/HBO)
 The Judy Garland Christmas Show (1963)
 Paul Lynde: 'Twas the Night Before Christmas (1977)
 Darci Lynne: A Hometown Christmas (2018)
 The Mitzi Gaynor Christmas Show (1967)
 Rich Little's Christmas Carol (1979/HBO)
 Dolly Parton: Home For Christmas (1990)
 Luther Vandross: This is Christmas (1996)

Julie Andrews
 Merry Christmas... with Love, Julie (1979)
 Julie Andrews: The Sound of Christmas (1987)

The Carpenters
 The Carpenters at Christmas (1977)
 The Carpenters: A Christmas Portrait (1978)

Kathie Lee Gifford
 Kathie Lee Gifford: Looking for Christmas (1994)
 Kathie Lee Gifford: Home for Christmas (1995)
 Kathie Lee Gifford: Just in Time for Christmas (1996)
 Kathie Lee Gifford: We Need a Little Christmas (1997)
 Kathie Lee Gifford: Christmas Every Day (1998)

Jackie Gleason
 Jackie Gleason's Honeymooners Christmas (1978/CBS)
 The Honeymooners Christmas Special (1977)

Amy Grant
 Headin' Home For The Holidays (1986/NBC)
 A Christmas To Remember (1999)

The Osmonds
 The Osmond Family Christmas Special (1976/ABC)
 The Osmond Family Christmas Special (1977)
 The Donny and Marie Christmas Special (1977/ABC)
 The Osmond Family Christmas Special (1978/ABC)
 The Donny and Marie Christmas Special (1979/ABC)
 The Osmond Family Christmas Special (1980/NBC)
 Marie Osmond's Merry Christmas (1986)

Andy WilliamsThe Andy Williams Christmas Special (1964)The Andy Williams Christmas Special (1965)The Andy Williams Christmas Special (1966)The Andy Williams Christmas Special (1967)The Andy Williams Christmas Special (1968)The Andy Williams Christmas Special (1969)The Andy Williams Christmas Special (1970)The Andy Williams Christmas Special (1971)The Andy Williams Christmas Special (1973)
 The Andy Williams Christmas Show (1974)
 Andy Williams' Early New England Christmas (1982)Andy Williams Christmas from Washington (1983)
 Andy Williams and the NBC Kids Search for Santa (NBC/1985)
 The Andy Williams Christmas Show (1994)
 The Daily Show Andy Williams Christmas Special (1997)
 Happy Holidays: The Best of the Andy Williams Christmas Specials (2001)

Bob Hope
 The Bob Hope Christmas Special (1953, 1968, 1970, 1980, 1981)
 The Bob Hope Christmas Show (1965, 1985)
 The Bob Hope Vietnam Christmas Show (1966)
 The Bob Hope Christmas Special: Around the World with the USO (1969)
 The Bob Hope Vietnam Christmas Show (1971)
 The Bob Hope All Star Christmas Comedy Special (1977)
 Bob Hope's USO Christmas in Beirut (1984)
 Bob Hope Winterfest Christmas Show (1987)
 Bob Hope's USO Christmas from the Persian Gulf: Around the World in Eight Days (1987)
 Bob Hope's Jolly Christmas Show (1988)
 Bob Hope's Christmas Special from Waikoloa, Hawaii (1989)
 Bob Hope's Christmas Cheer from Saudi Arabia (1991)
 Hope for the Holidays - A Bob Hope Christmas (1993)

Bing Crosby
 Happy Holidays with Frank and Bing starring Frank Sinatra and Bing Crosby (1957)
 The Bing Crosby Christmas Show (1961, 1962, 1965)
 Christmas with Andre, Bing, and Mary (1962)
 The Hollywood Palace with Bing Crosby (1965, 1966, 1967, 1968)
 Bing and Carol Together Again for the First Time (1969) Bing Crosby, with Carol Burnett
  Goldilocks (1969) Bing Crosby with Kathryn Crosby, Mary Frances Crosby and Nathaniel Crosby along with Avery Schreiber and Paul Winchell 
 Bing Crosby's Christmas Show (1970)
 Bing Crosby and the Sounds of Christmas (1971)
 A Christmas with the Bing Crosbys (1972)
 Bing Crosby's Sun Valley Christmas Show (1973)
 A Christmas with the Bing Crosbys (1974)
 Merry Christmas, Fred, from the Crosbys (1975) Bing Crosby, with Fred Astaire
 The Bing Crosby White Christmas Special (1976)
 Bing Crosby's Merrie Olde Christmas (1977) with David Bowie, Twiggy, and Ron Moody
 The Christmas Years (1978) tribute program

Dean Martin
 Dean Martin's California Christmas (1975)
 Dean Martin's Christmas in California (1977, 1979)
 Dean Martin Christmas Special (1980)
 Dean Martin's Christmas at Sea World (1981)

Perry Como
This is only a partial list of Perry Como Christmas programs. He would always include a Christmas-themed program every year while his television series was on the air.
 Perry Como's Christmas In New York (1959)
 The Perry Como Holiday Special (1967)
 Christmas At The Hollywood Palace (1969)
 Perry Como's Winter Show (1971)
 The Perry Como Winter Show (1972, 1973)
 Perry Como's Christmas Show (1974)
 Perry Como's Christmas In Mexico (1975)
 Perry Como's Christmas In Austria (1976)
 Perry Como's Olde Englishe Christmas (1977)
 Perry Como's Early American Christmas (1978)
 Perry Como's Christmas In New Mexico (1979)
 Perry Como's Christmas In The Holy Land (1980)
 Perry Como's French-Canadian Christmas (1981)
 Perry Como's Christmas In Paris (1982)
 Perry Como's Christmas In New York (1983)
 Perry Como's Christmas In London (1984)
 Perry Como's Christmas In Hawaii (1985)
 Perry Como's Christmas In San Antonio (1986)
 Perry Como's Irish Christmas (1994)

Mariah Carey
 Mariah Carey: Merry Christmas to You (2010, ABC)
 Mariah Carey's Merriest Christmas (2015, Hallmark Channel)
 Mariah Carey's Magical Christmas Special (2020, Apple TV+)

Television series-related
Specials based on a television series but which were not a regular time-slot episode.
 A Colbert Christmas: The Greatest Gift of All! (2008/Comedy Central)
 Care Bears Nutcracker Suite (1988/Disney Channel; Canadian production)
 He-Man and She-Ra: A Christmas Special (1985/syndication)
 Inspector Gadget Saves Christmas (1992/NBC)
 The Munsters' Scary Little Christmas (1996/FOX)
 A Pinky and the Brain Christmas (1995/The WB)
 Pee-wee's Playhouse Christmas Special (1988/CBS)
 Puff the Magic Dragon Christmas (1980/CBS)
 Dragon Tales Merry Christmas (2006/PBS)
 Shining Time Station: 'Tis a Gift (1990/PBS)
 Strawberry Shortcake's Berry Merry Christmas (2003)
 A Very Merry Curb Appeal''

See also
 Christmas in the media
 List of Christmas television specials
 List of United States Christmas television episodes
 List of A Christmas Carol adaptations
 List of Christmas films
 Christmas music
 Santa Claus in film
 List of Halloween television specials
 List of Thanksgiving television specials

References

 
Christmas television specials
Lists of television specials
United States television
Christmas in the United States